Dag Roger Rinde (born 1961) is a Norwegian businessperson.

He is the managing director of Statoil Norway and a member of the board at the Norwegian Petroleum Institute.

References

1961 births
Living people
Norwegian businesspeople
People in the petroleum industry
Equinor people